Petta is a genus in the polychaete family Pectinariidae.

Systematics
There are currently eight recognized species in the genus
 Petta alissoni - Nogueira, Ribeiro, Carrerette & Hutchings, 2019
Petta assimilis - McIntosh, 1885
Petta brevis - Zhang & Hutchings, 2021
Petta investigatoris - Zhang, Hutchings & Kupriyanova, 2019
 Petta pellucida - (Ehlers, 1887)
 Petta pusilla - Malmgren, 1866
 Petta tenuis - Caullery, 1944
Petta williamsonae - Zhang, Hutchings & Kupriyanova, 2019

References

Terebellida
Annelid genera